Miroslav Vodehnal (born 25 April 1976) is a footballer who has played as a forward for clubs in Czech Republic, Greece and Cyprus.

Playing career
Vodehnal began his career playing for Czech Gambrinus liga side FK Jablonec 97, appearing in 107 league matches for the club. He moved abroad in January 2005, joining Greek second division side Panachaiki for six months. He spent the next two seasons in the Cypriot second division, helping AEP Paphos F.C. and then APOP Kinyras Peyias FC gain promotion, before returning to the Czech Republic to play for FC Hradec Králové.

References

External links

ΞΕΝΟΙ ΠΑΙΚΤΕΣ ΚΑΙ ΠΡΟΠΟΝΗΤΕΣ ΤΗΣ ΠΑΝΑΧΑΪΚΗΣ

1976 births
Living people
Czech footballers
Czech expatriate footballers
FK Jablonec players
Panachaiki F.C. players
AEP Paphos FC players
APOP Kinyras FC players
FC Hradec Králové players
Czech First League players
Cypriot First Division players
Expatriate footballers in Greece
Expatriate footballers in Cyprus
FK Náchod-Deštné players
Association football forwards